Brampton—Springdale was a federal electoral district in Ontario, Canada, that was represented in the House of Commons of Canada from 2004 until 2015, when it was abolished after the 2012 federal electoral redistribution.

History
It was created in 2003 from Bramalea—Gore—Malton—Springdale and from Brampton Centre. It had a population of 116,775 in 2001 and an area of 59 km2. It consisted of the neighbourhoods of Snelgrove, the Villages of Heart Lake, Springdale (Brampton), Sandringham (Brampton), Madoc (Brampton)] and Bramalea Woods. Its last Member of Parliament was Parm Gill of the Conservative Party of Canada.

Member of Parliament
The riding has elected the following Members of Parliament:

Election results

See also
 List of Canadian federal electoral districts
 Past Canadian electoral districts

References

2004-2008 Election results from the Library of Parliament website
2011 Results from Elections Canada
Campaign expenses from Elections Canada website

Notes

Former federal electoral districts of Ontario
Politics of Brampton